Blancmange Hill is an outstanding ice-free coastal landmark located  northeast of Stark Point on the east side of Croft Bay, James Ross Island. It was named by the UK Antarctic Place-Names Committee following Falkland Islands Dependencies Survey surveys taken 1958–61. The name is descriptive since the feature resembles a blancmange.

References 

Hills of Graham Land
Landforms of James Ross Island